OGLE-2011-BLG-0462, also known as MOA-2011-BLG-191, is a stellar-mass black hole isolated in interstellar space. OGLE-2011-BLG-0462 lies at a distance of 5,000 light years in the direction of the galactic bulge in the constellation Sagittarius. OGLE-2011-BLG-0462 was discovered through microlensing when it passed in front of a background star that was 20,000 light years away from Earth. The black hole's gravity bent the star's light, causing a sharp spike in brightness that was detected by the Hubble Space Telescope. It took six years to confirm the existence of OGLE-2011-BLG-0462. Its initial kick velocity has been estimated to have an upper limit of

See also
 Rogue black hole

Reference 

Black holes
Sagittarius (constellation)
Gravitational lensing